Margareta Keszeg (born 31 August 1965) is a retired middle distance runner from Romania. She won several medals in European and World Indoor Championships over 3000 metres, including winning the 1992 European Indoor Championships. Her personal best time of 8:39.94 was set in 1992.

International competitions

References 
 

1965 births
Living people
People from Mediaș
Romanian female middle-distance runners
Romanian female long-distance runners
Olympic female middle-distance runners
Olympic female long-distance runners
Olympic athletes of Romania
Athletes (track and field) at the 1992 Summer Olympics
Universiade medalists in athletics (track and field)
Universiade silver medalists for Romania
Medalists at the 1985 Summer Universiade
World Athletics Indoor Championships medalists
World Athletics Championships athletes for Romania
Romanian sportspeople of Hungarian descent
Japan Championships in Athletics winners